Juan Carlos Oviedo (born March 15, 1982) is a Dominican former professional baseball pitcher. He bats and throws right-handed. At age 17, he began using the name Leo Núñez, although his true identity was revealed in 2011. He played in Major League Baseball (MLB) for the Kansas City Royals, Florida Marlins and Tampa Bay Rays.

Early life
Oviedo was born in Bonao in the Dominican Republic.  At age 17, Oviedo assumed the identity of his 16-year-old best friend, Leo Nunez, in order to receive a more lucrative contract. In 2011, Marlins reliever Edward Mujica, a close friend of Oviedo's, said that "[a]t 17 years old, you maybe lose $100,000 or $150,000 when you sign [compared to a 16-year-old with the same skills]. And if you're like 18, you might sign for $5,000 and maybe they give you an opportunity."

Professional career

Minor Leagues
Oviedo was originally signed by the Pittsburgh Pirates as an undrafted free agent on February 16, 2000. From 2001 to 2004, he was mainly used as a starting pitcher in the Pirates system. On December 16, 2004, he was traded to the Kansas City Royals for catcher Benito Santiago.

After being traded to the Royals, he was converted to a full-time relief pitcher. He began the 2005 season with the Single-A High Desert Mavericks. He was promoted to the Double-A Wichita Wranglers after posting a 9.00 ERA in eight games.

Kansas City Royals
He had his contract purchased by the big league club on May 9, 2005, and made his major league debut on the same day.

Along with teammates Ambiorix Burgos and Andrew Sisco, they were the first trio of rookie pitchers in major league history to throw at least 50.0 innings each without making a start. Oviedo finished the 2005 season with a 3–2 record and a 7.55 ERA in 41 games.

In 2006, Oviedo played for the Double-A Wranglers, Triple-A Omaha Royals, and at the major league level. He only played in seven major league games in 2006, with a 4.73 ERA.

In 2007, he was converted back into a starting pitcher.

On June 22, 2007, Oviedo would have been traded to the Oakland Athletics for outfielder Milton Bradley. However, according to the Royals report, Bradley was injured at the time, and the trade was voided.

Florida/Miami Marlins
After the 2008 season, Oviedo was traded by the Royals to the Florida Marlins for first baseman Mike Jacobs. In 2009, he became the Marlins closer after Matt Lindstrom was placed on the disabled list in late June.  He finished the season with 26 saves.

On April 1, 2012, MLB announced that they would suspend Oviedo for 6 weeks after he was removed from the restricted list. Oviedo had to get a visa to be removed. On May 28, Oviedo was suspended for 8 extra weeks for age and identity fraud. He would be eligible for one rehabilitation assignment in the minor leagues for a maximum of 16 days. He was eligible to play for the Marlins in the Major League on July 23. During a triple-A rehab game on July 16, Oviedo sprained his right elbow's ulnar collateral ligament and was later placed on disabled list. On September 6, 2012, Oviedo underwent Tommy John surgery.

Tampa Bay Rays
On January 22, 2013, Oviedo signed a minor league deal for the Tampa Bay Rays. He had his contract selected on March 31, 2013. Oviedo began the 2013 season on the 60-day disabled list still recovering from the Tommy John surgery he previously had. After missing all of the 2013 season, Oviedo had his $2 million club option for 2014 declined, and was instead paid a $30,000 buyout, making him a free agent. The Rays later re-signed him for the 2014 season. He was designated for assignment on July 26, 2014 and released on August 3.

Texas Rangers
On January 5, 2015, Oviedo signed a minor league contract with the Texas Rangers. He was released by the Rangers on March 28.

Name controversy
On September 22, 2011, the Florida Marlins placed Oviedo on the restricted list without listing a reason. The Associated Press reported that his real name was Juan Carlos Oviedo, that he was a year older than listed, and that he returned to the Dominican Republic to deal with the issue. Dominican Central Electoral Commission President Roberto Rosario said that Oviedo signed a sworn statement saying he used fake identification documents.

Notes

References

External links

1982 births
Living people
Age controversies
Águilas Cibaeñas players
Dominican Republic expatriate baseball players in the United States
Dominican Republic fraudsters
Florida Marlins players
Gigantes del Cibao players
Gulf Coast Pirates players
Hickory Crawdads players
High Desert Mavericks players
Jupiter Hammerheads players
Kansas City Royals players

Major League Baseball pitchers
Major League Baseball players from the Dominican Republic
New Orleans Zephyrs players
Northwest Arkansas Naturals players
Omaha Royals players
Tampa Bay Rays players
Wichita Wranglers players
Williamsport Crosscutters players